Light TV may refer to:
Light TV, a former name of the American television network TheGrio
Light TV, a subchannel of Philippine TV station DZOZ-DTV
Light TV, a related network of ZOE Broadcasting Network